St. Helens entered their 137th year in 2009, and were in contention for of rugby league's Super League and Carnegie Challenge Cup competitions.

2009 season

Super League XIV

Round 1
Saints come back from a 14-nil deficit early in the second half to beat Warrington Wolves 26-14.

Round 2
Saints turn over the much improved from last season Huddersfield Giants 23-6.

Round 3
Hull Kingston Rovers inflict Saints' first defeat of the season, with Michael Dobson scoring a late penalty goal to give the Robins a 20-19 win.

Round 4
Saints scrape past newly promoted Crusaders in the lowest scoring game in the Super League; Tom Armstrong scoring the only try in a 4-nil win.

Round 5
Saints brush aside the Salford City Reds by 38 points to 12.

Round 6
Saints edge a heated epic with Leeds Rhinos - winning 26-18 at Knowsley Road.

Round 7
Saints hammer Wakefield Trinity Wildcats by 42-18. The Wildcats are in mourning for reserve player Leon Walker, who died in a reserve game.

Round 8
Saints scrape past a fired up Wigan Warriors outfit, winning 19-12 after being 6-nil and 12-6 down.

Round 9
Saints bounce Hull F.C. in the second game of the Easter period by 44-22.

Round 10
Saints become the first team in Super League XIV to surpass 60 points, winning 68-22 at Castleford. Tony Puletua scores 4 tries but the game is halted for 30 minutes as Joe Westerman suffers a serious head injury.

Round 11
Saints suffer only their second defeat of the season as Bradford come back to win 34-30.

Round 12
Saints produce arguably their worst display of the campaign, losing 38-18 to arch rivals Wigan at the Magic Weekend.

Round 13
Saints defeat Catalans Dragons for the second time in a week, by coming back from 22-10 down to win 32-28 to move them back to the top of the table.

Round 14
Saints survive a second-half rally from Harlequins RL to win 22-12.

Round 15
Saints ease past the challenge of Hull FC, winning 30-6.

Round 16
Saints thrash Castleford for a second time this season in a 50 points to 10 success.

Round 17
Saints set a new record of 16 consecutive away wins in Super League after cantering to a 44-18 success over Bradford Bulls.

Round 18
Saints nil the Celtic Crusaders for a second time in the season - in a 30-0 win.

Round 19
Saints lose their fourth game of the season in a shock 20-10 loss to Salford.

Round 20
Saints beat neighbours Warrington for the second time in the league, in another fantastic game, this time by a margin of 40-26.

Round 21
Despite outscoring their opponents Wakefield by 5 tries to four, Saints crash to their second defeat in three games, losing 22-20.

Round 22
Saints bounce back from two defeats in three games with a convincing 44-24 win at Harlequins to take them back to two points clear at the top of the table.

Round 23
Saints edge a third game of the season against Wigan, with Kyle Eastmond scoring a late try to secure a 10-6 victory.

Round 24
Saints lost their third game in six as they crashed to a 26-10 loss at Hull KR.

Round 25
Another below-par performance saw Saints scrape past a youthful Huddersfield outfit by 12 points to 10, after being 10 points down.

Round 26
In a much improved performance, Saints are edged out by bitter rivals Leeds 18-10 in a third superb encounter of the season to all but end their hopes of a fifth consecutive League Leader's Shield.

Round 27
Saints are beaten by Catalans in the last game of the regular season to finish second in the league ladder behind Leeds.

Challenge Cup 2009

Round 4
Saints just edge past a second epic in two weeks against Leeds in a bruising encounter - pulling through 22-18.

Round 5
Saints thrash Catalans Dragons 42-8 to reach the Quarter Finals.

Quarter-Finals
Saints trounce a spirited Gateshead Thunder side 66-6 to advance to a record ninth consecutive Semi-Final.

Semi-Finals
Despite a Francis Meli hat-trick of tries, holders Saints were beaten 24-14 by Huddersfield.

Play-Off Series

Week 1
Saints beat Huddersfield in Week One to progress to the qualifying round in a 15-2 success.

Week 3
Saints reached a fourth consecutive Super League Grand Final after beating Wigan in a thrilling 14-10 win. They will take on Leeds for a third consecutive time at Old Trafford.

Super League Grand Final
Saints lose the grand final to Leeds Rhinos 18-10, this being the third consecutive Grand Final they lose to Leeds.

Upcoming Fixture(s)

Saints will round off their Super League XIV campaign against Leeds Rhinos at the 2009 Super League Grand Final.

News

It has been announced that, for the 2010 Super League Season, Saints have signed New Zealand World Cup winning  Iosia Soliola from the Sydney City Roosters on a three-year deal.  Additionally, Scrum-Half Sean Long will be leaving Knowsley Road after a 12-year stint. He is joining Hull F.C. on a two-year contract. Lee Gilmour is also on his way out of St Helens. The second-row has agreed a two year deal with Huddersfield Giants for the 2010 season. Young half-back Matty Smith will join Salford City Reds for the 2010 season in a loan agreement. Prop-forward Jason Cayless will be leaving Saints too after 4 seasons with the club owing to a shoulder injury. He will return to Australia. Hull Kingston Rovers prop Nick Fozzard will re-join Saints after being released from the final year of his Rovers contract.

Current squad

2009 Transfers

Acquisitions

Losses

Fixtures and results

League table

2009 Squad
As of 29 July 2009:

1 - Meli and Puletua won caps for New Zealand before switching to Samoa 

2 - Pryce is of Jamaican origin 

3 - Fa'asavalu switched his allegiance to England under the residency rule

External links
St Helens' official website
engage Super League official website

References

St Helens R.F.C. seasons
St Helens RLFC season